Charles Gallet (26 November 1875 - 1 November 1951) was a French lawyer and politician. He started his career as a lawyer in La Roche-sur-Yon. He served as a member of the Chamber of Deputies from 1928 to 1936, where he represented Vendée. He was succeeded by François Boux de Casson.

References

1875 births
1951 deaths
People from Vendée
Politicians from Pays de la Loire
Popular Democratic Party (France) politicians
Members of the 14th Chamber of Deputies of the French Third Republic
Members of the 15th Chamber of Deputies of the French Third Republic